Ortholomus is a genus of true bugs belonging to the family Lygaeidae.

The species of this genus are found in Europe.

Species:
 Ortholomus carinatus (Lindberg, 1932) 
 Ortholomus jordani Hoberlandt, 1953 
 Ortholomus punctipennis (Herrich-Schaeffer, 1850)

References

Lygaeidae